Nevada's 14th Senate district is one of 21 districts in the Nevada Senate. It has been represented by Republican Ira Hansen since 2018, succeeding fellow Republican Don Gustavson.

Geography
District 14 stretches from the suburbs of Reno in Washoe County to many of the state's rural areas in Esmeralda, Humboldt, Lander, Mineral, Nye, and Pershing Counties. Communities within the district include Winnemucca, Battle Mountain, Hawthorne, Lovelock, Tonopah, Goldfield, Spanish Springs, Golden Valley, Lemmon Valley, and parts of Sparks and Sun Valley. The district is also home to Black Rock City, home to the annual festival Burning Man.

The district overlaps with Nevada's 2nd and 4th congressional districts, and with the 31st and 32nd districts of the Nevada Assembly. It borders the states of California, Oregon, and – just barely – Idaho.

Recent election results
Nevada Senators are elected to staggered four-year terms; since 2012 redistricting, the 14th district has held elections in midterm years.

2018

2014

Federal and statewide results in District 14

References 

14
Esmeralda County, Nevada
Humboldt County, Nevada
Lander County, Nevada
Mineral County, Nevada
Nye County, Nevada
Pershing County, Nevada
Washoe County, Nevada